"Swish Swish" is a song by American singer Katy Perry featuring rapper Nicki Minaj for Perry's fifth studio album, Witness (2017). It was written by both artists along with Duke Dumont, Sarah Hudson, PJ "Promnite" Sledge and Brittany Hazzard, while being produced by Dumont, with additional production by Sledge and Noah "Mailbox" Passovoy and vocal production by Passovoy. The song was initially released as a promotional single on May 19, 2017, and later as the album's third single. "Swish Swish" is a house-inspired EDM and hip hop song that samples "I Get Deep" by Roland Clark.

The song uses basketball metaphors to address Perry's bullies and detractors. Multiple media outlets suspected that the song is about American singer-songwriter Taylor Swift and her 2015 single "Bad Blood", which was believed to be about Perry. Critics wrote mixed reviews of "Swish Swish"; some praised the track's empowering environment and Minaj's verse, while others criticized the song's lyrics.

Promotion for the track began with a live debut of the track on Saturday Night Live, with a performance that went viral. Subsequently, Perry continued to promote the track during BBC Radio 1's Big Weekend, the Glastonbury Festival 2017 and The Voice Australia. Later, to further promote the track, a lyric video for the track, featuring Brazilian singer Gretchen, was released on July 3, 2017. The official music video, directed by Dave Meyers, premiered on August 24, 2017. Three days later, Perry and Minaj performed the track together for the first time during the 2017 MTV Video Music Awards. "Swish Swish" reached the top 10 in the Philippines and Scotland in addition to the top 20 in Canada and the United Kingdom as well as the top 30 in Australia and Ireland. It has also been certified platinum in Australia, Canada and the US, and was featured in the video game Just Dance 2018.

Production and release
After Duke Dumont produced a track Perry recorded for H&M's 2015 holiday campaign called "Every Day Is a Holiday", he expressed interest in working with the singer again, adding: "I think we could switch things up a little more for the next record. Who knows what we could do?." Eventually, they paired together to work on the record, with Dumont claiming that Perry was a fan of his music and that they kept in touch, noting that "her vision for the album wasn't a million miles away from the stuff I'm making." He added: "[...] working on this project it was great seeing what her vision was for the album and being able to help with that. I am genuinely excited for the music." Dumont also said that "it was a very easy process and we made the song quickly. And then about two weeks ago I heard that [Nicki Minaj] is going to feature on it, it was very quick."

Minaj's appearance on the track was only discovered when the song was released. Minaj and Perry previously worked together on Minaj's song "Get on Your Knees", with Perry writing it with the rapper. However, she did not have time to record her vocals, and Ariana Grande ended up singing the song. As Perry recalled, "We've always wanted to collaborate, we've done so many things together... we did a VH1 show. [...] I actually sent her a couple of songs before these songs were out and she loved 'Swish Swish' the most and she just did it so much justice. Honestly, I just want her to do the whole song." Perry also talked about Minaj's rap skills, commenting: "With Nicki, she's such a [boss-ass bitch] that you can send her anything and her pen game is crazy." On May 18, 2017, Perry announced on Instagram the track would be released at midnight Eastern time. "Swish Swish" was released the next day as the third single from her fifth album Witness, and was included along with the pre-order of the album upon its debut. Its single cover features Perry's "blinged-out hand holding receipts from a place called 'Karma Coffee & Tea'." On May 26, 2017, Capitol Records confirmed it would focus on promoting "Swish Swish" to pop radio.

Composition and lyrics
"Swish Swish" was written by Perry with Duke Dumont, Sarah Hudson, PJ "Promnite" Sledge, Minaj, and Brittany Hazzard, while its production was done by Dumont with additional production by Sledge and Noah "Mailbox" Passovoy. The song samples "I Get Deep" by Roland Clark. "Swish Swish" was noted to have a beat similar to Maya Jane Coles' "What They Say" (2010). The song is performed in the key of F minor with a tempo of 120 beats per minute in common time. It follows a chord progression of Cm–A♭maj–Gm–Cm–A♭maj–Fm, and Perry's vocals span from E♭3 to A♭4. The track is four minutes and two seconds long. "Swish Swish" is a house-inspired EDM song. Raisa Bruner of Time defined it as a hip hop song. It starts with a sparse piano, before the "club-ready beat" kicks in. Lyrically, "Swish Swish" uses basketball metaphors to talk about getting over the haters. As added by Da'Shan Smith of Billboard "'Swish Swish' "is targeted towards a 'sheep' who is 'calculated' but not capable of bringing down Perry's spirits." Perry stated "Swish Swish" represents "a liberation from all the negative that doesn't serve you" as part of the "360-degree liberation" theme of her Witness album. She also called it a "great anthem for people to use when someone's trying to hold you down or bully you". The song starts with Perry comparing herself to a tiger, "declaring that one 'don't lose no sleep/ don't need opinions/ from a shellfish or a sheep.'" During the song, she claims herself as a "courtside killer queen," and in the chorus, Perry "sweetly" sings "'Swish swish, bish. Another one in the basket!'." Minaj's rap alludes to her "silly rap beefs" as well as Migos.

Following its release, several publications suggested that "Swish Swish" was a diss track in response to Taylor Swift's "Bad Blood" (2014), which was believed to be about Perry. Before the song being released, Perry was asked if there was a reaction to "Bad Blood" on Witness, with Perry replying: "I think [my new album is] a very empowered record. There is no one thing that's calling out any one person. One thing to note is: You can't mistake kindness for weakness and don't come for me. Anyone. Anyone. Anyone. Anyone. And that's not to any one person and don't quote me that it is, because it's not. It's not about that. Honestly, when women come together and they decide to unite, this world is going to be a better place. Period end of story. But, let me say this: Everything has a reaction or a consequence so don't forget about that, okay, honey." When asked if the song was directed at anyone in particular on The Tonight Show Starring Jimmy Fallon, Perry simply replied that the song is an anti-bullying anthem. Additionally, Nicki Minaj's verse contains the line, "Silly rap beefs just get me more checks," which addresses Minaj's own purported "beef" with rapper Remy Ma, while also referring to her as a stan. On May 22, 2017, while appearing on the Carpool Karaoke segment on The Late Late Show with James Corden, after singing to "Swish Swish", Corden asked Perry about a 2013 feud between her and Swift. "There's a situation. [...] Honestly, it's really like she started it, and it's time for her to finish it." She also added: "[T]here is the law of cause and effect. You do something, there's going to be a reaction, and trust me daddy, there's going to be a reaction. It's all about karma, right?."

Critical reception

"Swish Swish" divided music critics at release. Leonie Cooper of NME was very positive, noting that "calling in Nicki Minaj's fast and furious flow for the Fatboy Slim-sampling 'Swish Swish', meanwhile, is something of a master stroke, turning a good song into a great one." Raisa Bruner of Time defined the song as "a feisty hip-hop track that lets both artists show off their respective areas of expertise". Rianne Houghton of Digital Spy called it "a sexy, shady banger, and it's all about keeping receipts." Hannah J Davies of The Guardian claimed that the song "is a house-fuelled banger with undeniable groove and nonsense content." Kevin O'Donnell of Entertainment Weekly called "Swish Swish" "one of the best party-starters of her career, destined for some killer remixes," also praising the "fiery verse" from Nicki Minaj.

Nylon writer Sydney Gore also praised Minaj for being "absolutely ruthless when she comes in toward the end." Kitty Empire of The Observer also noted that "the Roland Clark sample" and "the ever-inventive Nicki Minaj, provides more top-flight, shade-throwing diva product." Sal Cinquemani of Slant Magazine praised that Perry "convincingly dabbles in house" in the song. Wren Graves for Consequence of Sound picked as the album's standout track, defining it as a "spunky, funky kiss-off track with a spellbinding beat by Duke Dumont, [where] Perry is deadly with her put-downs" and "Nicki Minaj is trotted out for punchline duty and punches gamely." Stephen Thomas Erlewine of AllMusic also selected it as a highlight from the album. Mikael Wood of Los Angeles Times thought the song was "a delight as Perry rhymes 'another one in the basket' with 'another one in the casket' over Duke Dumont's thrusting '90s-house beat".

Jillian Mapes of Pitchfork was less favorable, declaring: "If you're going to do something as tired as fueling this beef, at least give us the satisfaction of making it deliciously shady." Anna Gaca of Spin noted it as "another single that makes little sense", and "a random grab bag of Perry's vocals, obnoxious voice-altering effects, and piano flourishes, all laid over a house-inflected beat". Gavin Miller of Drowned in Sound was mixed in his review, calling "largely just a deep house track with Katy Perry singing a topline, which isn't a bad thing," but felt the producers were "just offering up tunes they've had on their hard drives for Perry's team to compartmentalise and see what demographics they represent." Neil McCormick of The Daily Telegraph felt the song was "too generic to land any blows," while Mike Wass of Idolator felt Minaj's verse was "generic" and that it "sounds like a rehash of every feature she has released in 2017."

Retrospectively, Glamour called the song a "moment of brilliance" on Witness with its "basement rave-ready beat and cheeky lyrics". Entertainment Weekly called it a "vogue-worthy tribute to 90's house music, complete with hissing hi-hats, endearingly goofy lyrics" and a "gag-worthy" Nicki Minaj guest verse.

Commercial performance

In the United States, "Swish Swish" debuted and peaked at number 46 on the Billboard Hot 100 while reaching number 33 on the Pop Songs chart. The song fared better on the Dance Club Songs chart, becoming her 18th number-one on the chart. By having eighteen songs at the top, Perry became the fifth singer with most number-ones on the Dance Club charts and extended her record for most consecutive number-one songs on the chart. As of September 2017, it has sold 165,288 copies in the country, and has been certified Platinum by the Recording Industry Association of America (RIAA). In Canada, the song first opened at number 27 on the Canadian Hot 100. "Swish Swish" later climbed to number 13, becoming Perry's 22nd top-twenty entry in the nation. It has since been certified Platinum by Music Canada (MC) for shipments of 80,000 units.

In Australia, "Swish Swish" first entered at number 37 on the ARIA Charts on June 4, 2017, before peaking at number 22 in July. In the United Kingdom, "Swish Swish" debuted at number 40 on the UK Singles Chart. It ascended to number 29 following the music video's release as well as Perry and Minaj's live performance of the track at the 2017 MTV Video Music Awards, and later reached number 19 in the nation. "Swish Swish" has also been certified Platinum by the British Phonographic Industry (BPI) for shipments of 600,000 units. In Germany, "Swish Swish" became Perry's lowest charting single, peaking at number 76; despite this, the single got certified Gold by BMVI for shipments of 200,000 units.

Music video

Development

A lyric video for the song was released on YouTube on July 3, 2017, and features Brazilian singer and reality television personality Gretchen. It was directed by Dario Vetere, and it features choreography by Fabio Duarte and CK Calasans. Two days later, Perry announced a contest titled the "#SwishSwishChallenge" for dancers to appear in the song's official music video where candidates submit videos of themselves dancing, and she would select her favorite dancer. After applicants posted their entries by the end of July 12, the video was filmed later in the month. A teaser for the official video was posted on August 21, 2017, on Perry's personal YouTube account.

Synopsis and reception
The official music video for the single was directed by Dave Meyers and released on August 24, 2017. It includes appearances from Russell Horning, Gaten Matarazzo, Jenna Ushkowitz, Doug the Pug, Christine Sydelko, Dexter Mayfield, Rob Gronkowski, Joey Chestnut, Molly Shannon, Hafþór Júlíus Björnsson, Karl-Anthony Towns, Rich Eisen, Bill Walton, and Terry Crews. Kia Stevens, Britney Young, Sydelle Noel, Ellen Wong, and Jackie Tohn make appearances as their characters from GLOW. In the video, Perry plays "Kobe Perry" the captain of the basketball team "The Tigers" whose opponents are known as "The Sheep", and Minaj performs during the game's halftime show. The video also features the brief reappearance of Kathy Beth Terry, Perry's character from "Last Friday Night (T.G.I.F.)", as well as a short gameplay clip from Just Dance 2018 and a brief segment featuring the Bag Raiders song, "Shooting Stars". Stadion Narodowy in Warsaw, Poland, was used for exterior views of the venue in the video. The official music video has over 667 million views on YouTube as of October 2022.

Elias Leight of Rolling Stone named it "goofy". Dave Holmes of Esquire noted that "like all great pop music videos, 'Swish Swish' leaves you exhausted, annoyed, confused, and a good seven years older than you were six minutes ago. It's a shame, too, because when Katy Perry stops trying to be your hilarious best friend, she's capable of great pop music." Jordan Sargent of Spin wrote that the video was "bad", though added "it does at least feel like Katy Perry in all her messy glory. Still, there's a gulf between Perry's slapstick character and the fang-toothed, confrontational song that's impossible to bridge. As such, Perry barely even performs the song during the video. Instead, it's as if 'Swish Swish' is the music playing softly behind a comedy sketch that you're not really meant to pay attention to."

Live performances

Perry performed "Swish Swish" solo on the Saturday Night Live season finale on May 20, 2017. The performance quickly went viral, with much of the attention coming towards dancer Russell Horning, dubbed the "Backpack Kid", whose arm-swinging dance move ("the Floss") became widely imitated. Perry also performed the song during her set on BBC Radio 1's Big Weekend on May 27, 2017, the Glastonbury Festival 2017 on June 24, 2017, as well as on The Voice finale on July 2, 2017, featuring male dancers in high heels. On June 26, Minaj performed a verse of the song at the first-ever 2017 NBA Awards. Perry also performed the song live with Minaj for the first time at the 2017 MTV Video Music Awards. As stated by Billboard Joe Lynch, Perry started the performance "standing atop an enormous half-basketball on stage." As Lynch wrote, "her backup dancers sport[ed] nets-for-veils on their faces", while later "the half-basketball rotated around to reveal Nicki Minaj hidden inside." Near the end of the performance, Perry flew "above the crowd and landing atop a basketball hoop just in time to end the show on a literal slam dunk while basketball balloons dropped over the crowd." The song is also performed on Perry's Witness: The Tour. Halfway through the performance, Perry invites a member from the audience onstage for a basketball shooting contest.

Track listing
 Digital download
 "Swish Swish" (featuring Nicki Minaj) – 4:02

 Digital download (Cheat Codes remix)
"Swish Swish" (Cheat Codes remix; featuring Nicki Minaj) – 3:01

 Digital download (Valentino Khan remix)
 "Swish Swish" (Valentino Khan remix; featuring Nicki Minaj) – 3:20

 Digital download (Blonde remix)
 "Swish Swish" (Blonde remix) – 4:06

Credits and personnel

Recording locations
 Recorded at Unsub Studios (Los Angeles, California), Blasé Boys Studios (Hertfordshire, England), Jungle City Studios (New York City, New York) and Glenwood Place Studios (Burbank, California)
 Mixed at MixStar Studios (Virginia Beach, Virginia)
 Mastered at Sterling Sound (New York City, New York)

Personnel

 Katy Perry – lead vocals, songwriter
 Nicki Minaj – featured vocals, songwriter
 Duke Dumont – songwriter, producer, synths, drums, programming
 PJ "Promnite" Sledge – songwriter, additional producer, keyboards
 Noah "Mailbox" Passovoy – songwriter, additional producer, engineering, vocal producer, additional keys, programming
 Sarah Hudson – songwriter
 Rachael Findlen – engineering
 Zeke Mishanec – engineering assistant
 Aubry "Big Juice" Delaine – additional engineering, vocals recording (Nicki Minaj)
 Ian Findlay – vocals engineering assistant (Nicki Minaj)
 Serban Ghenea – mixing
 John Hanes – mixing engineering
 Randy Merrill – mastering

Credits and personnel adapted from Witness album liner notes.

Charts

Weekly charts

Year-end charts

Certifications

Release history

See also
 List of Billboard Dance Club Songs number ones of 2017

References

External links
 
 

2017 singles
2017 songs
Capitol Records singles
Katy Perry songs
Music videos directed by Dave Meyers (director)
Nicki Minaj songs
Songs written by Katy Perry
Songs written by Nicki Minaj
Songs written by Sarah Hudson (singer)
Songs written by Starrah
Diss tracks
Songs written by Duke Dumont
Songs about bullying